Alexander Greig Ellis Lawrie (19 June 1907 – 13 December 1978) was an Australian politician. Born in Maitland, New South Wales, he was educated at The Scots College in Sydney before moving to Evergreen in Queensland to become a grazier. He was an official of the Queensland Graziers' Association and served as Queensland State President of the Country Party 1960–1964. In 1963, he was elected to the Australian Senate as a Country Party Senator for Queensland. He remained a Senator until his retirement in 1975.

Lawrie died in 1978 (aged 71), survived by his wife Margaret . They had married on 11 May 1939 and had four children.

References

National Party of Australia members of the Parliament of Australia
Members of the Australian Senate for Queensland
Members of the Australian Senate
1907 births
1978 deaths
People from Maitland, New South Wales
20th-century Australian politicians